The 2019 Aspria Tennis Cup was a professional tennis tournament played on clay courts. It was the fourteenth edition of the tournament which was part of the 2019 ATP Challenger Tour. It took place in Milan, Italy between 24 and 30 June 2019.

Singles main-draw entrants

Seeds

 1 Rankings are as of 17 June 2019.

Other entrants
The following players received wildcards into the singles main draw:
  Francesco Forti
  Paolo Lorenzi
  Lorenzo Musetti
  Julian Ocleppo
  Giulio Zeppieri

The following players received entry into the singles main draw using their ITF World Tennis Ranking:
  Riccardo Bonadio
  Raúl Brancaccio
  Corentin Denolly
  Christopher Heyman
  Oriol Roca Batalla

The following players received entry from the qualifying draw:
  Aslan Karatsev
  Alex Molčan

The following player received entry as a lucky loser:
  Riccardo Balzerani

Champions

Singles

  Hugo Dellien def.  Danilo Petrović 7–5, 6–4.

Doubles

  Tomislav Brkić /  Ante Pavić def.  Andrei Vasilevski /  Andrea Vavassori 7–6(8–6), 6–2.

References

2019 ATP Challenger Tour
2019
2019 in Italian tennis
June 2019 sports events in Italy